Patricia Okafor is a Nigerian Paralympic powerlifter. She represented Nigeria at the 2000 Summer Paralympics held in Sydney, Australia and she won the gold medal in the women's 67.5 kg event.

References

External links 
 

Living people
Year of birth missing (living people)
Place of birth missing (living people)
Powerlifters at the 2000 Summer Paralympics
Medalists at the 2000 Summer Paralympics
Paralympic gold medalists for Nigeria
Paralympic medalists in powerlifting
Paralympic powerlifters of Nigeria
Nigerian powerlifters